Hatvan is a district in western part of Heves County. Hatvan is also the name of the town where the district seat is found. The district is located in the Northern Hungary Statistical Region.

Geography 
Hatvan District borders with Pásztó District (Nógrád County) to the north, Gyöngyös District to the east, Jászberény District (Jász-Nagykun-Szolnok County) to the south, Aszód District (Pest County) to the west. The number of the inhabited places in Hatvan District is 14.

Municipalities 
The district has 2 towns and 12 villages.
(ordered by population, as of 1 January 2012)

The bolded municipalities are cities.

Demographics

In 2011, it had a population of 51,246 and the population density was 146/km².

Ethnicity
Besides the Hungarian majority, the main minorities are the Roma (approx. 1,500), German (200) and Romanian (100).

Total population (2011 census): 51,246
Ethnic groups (2011 census): Identified themselves: 46,763 persons:
Hungarians: 44,794 (95.79%)
Gypsies: 1,254 (2.68%)
Others and indefinable: 715 (1.53%)
Approx. 4,500 persons in Hatvan District did not declare their ethnic group at the 2011 census.

Religion
Religious adherence in the county according to 2011 census:

Catholic – 28,787 (Roman Catholic – 28,620; Greek Catholic – 159);
Reformed – 1,601;
Evangelical – 398; 
other religions – 631; 
Non-religious – 6,755; 
Atheism – 397;
Undeclared – 12,677.

Gallery

See also
List of cities and towns of Hungary

References

External links
 Postal codes of the Hatvan District

Districts in Heves County